= The Mark Inside (novel) =

Book by Amy Reading

First edition (publ. Knopf)

The Mark Inside is a book by Amy Reading about a Texas rancher set in 1919.
